Anders Poulsen (born 4 June 1981) is a Danish football referee. He has refereed in the Danish Superliga, in UEFA Europa League qualifying games and at international games at under-17 level.

References

External links 
 
 
 
 

1981 births
Living people
Danish football referees
Place of birth missing (living people)